Nicolas Alexandre Barbier (1789–1864) was a French landscape painter.

Life
Born in Paris, he initially painted architectural subjects, but later became part of the realistic school of landscape painting, and exhibited a large number of works at the Paris Salons between 1824 and 1861. He died at Sceaux in 1864.

References

Sources
 

18th-century French painters
French male painters
19th-century French painters
1789 births
1864 deaths
Painters from Paris
19th-century French male artists
18th-century French male artists